Michał Gajownik (15 December 1981 – 13 November 2009) was a Polish sprint canoer who competed from 2000 to 2006. He won three medals at the ICF Canoe Sprint World Championships with two golds (C-4 1000 m: 2002, 2005) and a bronze (C-4 500 m: 2005). He was born in Chrzanów.

Gajownik won silver medal in C-1 500 m in Junior European Championships in 1998, after year became C-2 500 m Junior World Championships silver medalist. The following year, at age 19, he became senior European C-2 1000 m champion with Paweł Baraszkiewicz who became later a member of Posnania Poznań . At the Sydney Olympics, however, they finished in eighth place.

After Sydney, Gajownik concentrated on the four-man canoe. At the start of the 2003 season, however, he tested positive for nandrolone – same as Marcin Kobierski, twice medalist in C-2 1000 m. Both denied the charge but were given a two-year ban, which cost them a place at the 2004 Olympics.

Gajownik returned to competitive action in 2005. He was a member of the Posnania Poznań club until 2006. He was killed in a traffic collision on 13 November 2009 in Chrzanów.

References

 
Posnania Club

External links

1981 births
2009 deaths
Canoeists at the 2000 Summer Olympics
Olympic canoeists of Poland
Doping cases in canoeing
Polish male canoeists
Polish sportspeople in doping cases
Road incident deaths in Poland
People from Chrzanów
ICF Canoe Sprint World Championships medalists in Canadian
Sportspeople from Lesser Poland Voivodeship